Nowlan is a surname. Notable people with the surname include:

Alden Nowlan (1933–1983), Canadian poet, novelist, and playwright
Cherie Nowlan (née Singleton), Australian film and television director, known for the 2007 film Clubland
George Nowlan, PC (1898–1965), Canadian member of Parliament and Cabinet Minister
James Nowlan (1862–1924), President of the Gaelic Athletic Association (GAA) from 1901 to 1921
James William Nowlan (1818–1900), political figure in New Brunswick, Canada
John Nowlan (1821–1895), Irish-born Australian politician
Kevin Nowlan (born 1958), American comic-book artist
Lawrence Nowlan (1965–2013), American sculptor and figurative artist
Max Nowlan (born 1939), former Australian rules footballer
Pat Nowlan (born 1931), Canadian parliamentarian and son of Diefenbaker-era Minister of Finance George Nowlan
Patrick Nowlan (1827–1896), merchant and political figure in Newfoundland
Philip Francis Nowlan (1888–1940), American science fiction author, best known as the creator of Buck Rogers

See also
Lovejoy and Merrill-Nowlan Houses, located in the Courthouse Hill Historic District in Janesville, Wisconsin
Nowlan Park, Gaelic Athletic Association stadium in Kilkenny, Ireland
Knowland
Nolan
Olan (disambiguation)